The Samoan records in swimming are the fastest ever performances of swimmers from Samoa, which are recognised and ratified by the Samoa Swimming Federation.

All records were set in finals unless noted otherwise.

Long Course (50 m)

Men

Women

Mixed relay

Short Course (25 m)

Men

Women

References

Samoa
Records
Swimming
Swimming